The Parkari Koli language (sometimes called just Parkari) is a language mainly spoken in the province of Sindh, Pakistan.  It is spoken in the southeast tip bordering India, Tharparkar District, Nagarparkar. Most of the lower Thar Desert, west as far as Indus River, bordered north and west by Hyderabad, to south and west of Badin.

Lexical similarity

77%–83% with Marwari, 83% with Wadiyara Koli.

Orthography

The orthography was standardized in 1983-84 and used from 1985 onward. These letters all use an inverted V (like the circumflex) as the diacritical mark because Sindhi already makes frequent use of dots.

References

Koli people

External links
 Proposal to add Parkari letters to Arabic block

Western Indo-Aryan languages
Languages of Sindh